Goat Roti is a type of roti, a traditional Trinidadian dish, popular in the Caribbean and in Caribbean communities throughout the world. It consists of curried goat and vegetables wrapped in a roti.

See also
 Curry puff
 List of goat dishes

References

Trinidad and Tobago cuisine
Jamaican cuisine
Guyanese cuisine
Roti
Flatbread dishes
Goat dishes
Indo-Caribbean cuisine
Indo-Trinidadian and Tobagonian culture
Stuffed dishes